Pentrepiod Halt railway station may refer to the following stations in Wales:
Pentrepiod Halt railway station (Gwynedd)
Pentrepiod Halt railway station (Monmouthshire)